Helen Shingler (29 August 1919 – 8 October 2019) was a British film and television actress.

Biography 
Shingler was born on 29 August 1919. She married producer Seafield Head, and was the mother of actor and singer Murray Head and actor Anthony Head, as well as the grandmother of Kathryn and Sophie Head and actresses Emily and Daisy Head. Her television roles include Madame Maigret in the BBC Television series, Maigret (1960-63), in which Rupert Davies played the eponymous French detective. She died in October 2019, some five weeks after celebrating her 100th birthday.

Selected filmography
 Quiet Weekend (1946)
 The Silver Darlings (1947)
 The Long Mirror (1948) (as Valerie Camber)
 The Rossiter Case (1951)
 The Lady with a Lamp (1951)
 Judgment Deferred (1952)
 Love's a Luxury (1952)
 Laughing Anne (1953)
 Background (1953)
 Room in the House (1955)
 Rx Murder (1958)

References

External links

 

1919 births
2019 deaths
20th-century British actresses
Actresses from London
British centenarians
British film actresses
British television actresses
Women centenarians
20th-century English women
20th-century English people